Psorosa mediterranella is a species of snout moth. It is found in France, Spain, Portugal, Italy, Croatia, Bosnia and Herzegovina and North Macedonia.

References

Moths described in 1953
Phycitini
Moths of Europe